Tim Minchin and the Heritage Orchestra is an orchestral concert tour by Australian musician and comedian Tim Minchin, accompanied by the Heritage Orchestra (UK dates) and city symphony orchestras (Australian dates, titled Tim Minchin vs. The Orchestras).

Set list 

"I'm in a Cage / Nothing Ruins Comedy"
"Rock N Roll Nerd"
"Cont"
"If I Didn't Have You"
"Thank You God"
"You Grew On Me"
"The Fence" 
Interval
"Prejudice"
"Lullaby"
"The Pope Song / Pope Disco"
"Cheese"
"Beauty"
"Dark Side"
Encore
"Not Perfect"
"White Wine in the Sun"

Tour dates

Home releases

CD and Audio 
The tour was recorded for CD and audio at the Manchester Arena on 17 December 2010.

DVD 
The tour was filmed at the Royal Albert Hall, London on 29 April 2011 (coincidentally the same date as the wedding of Prince William and Catherine Middleton, which Minchin referenced). The DVD was released on 14 November 2011, and subsequently broadcast on television and Netflix.

References 

2010 concert tours
2011 concert tours
2012 concert tours